Eastern Shore Memorial Hospital (ESMH) is a hospital in Sheet Harbour, Nova Scotia.  It is operated by Nova Scotia Health Authority.

Services 

 Palliative and Respite Care
 Acute Care
 Outpatient/Emergency
 Ambulatory Care
 Diagnostic Imaging
 Laboratory Services
 Physiotherapy
 Occupational Therapy
 Clinical Nutrition
 Social Services
 Adult Day Clinic, Diabetic Clinic, Meals-on-Wheels

History 
Eastern Shore Memorial Hospital was built to serve the easternmost area of coastal Halifax County from East Ship Harbour to Ecum Secum. It was proposed by a group of community members, led by Dr. Duncan MacMillan. The architect was Leslie R. Fairn. Construction started in 1947 and the hospital was opened on May 24, 1949. It cost $170,000. $34,000 was contributed by the provincial and federal governments, and the remaining $136,000 came from community donations. The Canadian Red Cross ran the hospital until July 15, 1954.

In 1983, a new wing was added to the hospital. The old wing was converted to a nursing home, named Duncan MacMillan Nursing Home. In 2011, Duncan MacMillan Nursing Home was demolished and replaced by Harbourview Lodge.

References

Sources

External links
 ESMH Website

Hospital buildings completed in 1949
Hospital buildings completed in 1983
Hospitals in Halifax, Nova Scotia
Hospitals established in 1949
1949 establishments in Nova Scotia